Conjectura glabella is a species of small sea snail or micromollusc, a marine gastropod mollusc in the family Conradiidae.

Distribution
This marine species is endemic to New Zealand (Stewart Island, Foveaux Strait, Off Otago Heads, and Snares Islands)

References

 Powell A. W. B., New Zealand Mollusca, William Collins Publishers Ltd, Auckland, New Zealand 1979 
 Beu, A.G.; Maxwell, P.A. 1990:  Cenozoic Mollusca of New Zealand.  New Zealand Geological Survey Paleontological Bulletin 58: 518 Pp.
 Spencer H.G., Willan R.C., Marshall B.A. & Murray T.J. (2011) Checklist of the Recent Mollusca Recorded from the New Zealand Exclusive Economic Zone

External links
 Museum of New Zealand: Conjectura glabella
 New Zealand Mollusca: Conjectura glabella

glabella
Gastropods of New Zealand
Gastropods described in 1908